The Angry General is a 1964 Australian television play written by Australian author Allan Trevor.

Premise
The play is set in London in the present day. Former wartime minister, Lord Athol Medway, publishes his memoirs attacking the leadership of Major-General Forbes Barrington-Hunt in the war during a disastrous commando raid. Barrington-Hunt sets out to clear his name.

Cast
Raymond Westwell as Major-General Forbes Barrington-Hunt
Edward Howell as Lord Athol Medway
Williams Lloyd as Sir Geoffrey Bryson
Norman Kaye as Major Derek Barrington-Hunt
Joan Letch as Jane Barrington-Hunt
Dorothy Bradley as Elizabeth Barrington-Hunt
Joan MacArthur as Miriam Barrington-Hunt
Campbell Copelin as Gen George Chaesling
Douglas Kelly as Dobson
Kenrick Hudson as Dickie
Raymond O'Reilly as Hodge
Neville Thurgood as Benbow
Christine Calcutt as sister

Production
It was one of 20 TV plays produced by the ABC in 1964 (and one of only three Australian scripts). It was the first one that year to originate in Melbourne.

It was a play by Australian actor and author Allan Trevor and was produced in Melbourne. Trevor called the play "a study in motives — the motives that make people accept what is not right to achieve their own ends." He said the plot was "based very loosely on the case history of one of the numerous generals 'bowlerhatted' for no apparent reason during World War II." Trevor added that "It has as a leading character a 62 year old man still vital enough to dominate a television play. Dramatic events do not all happen to the young, clean cut chaps with wavy hair who turn up so often."

It was the Australian TV debut of Raymond Westwell. He had only acted once before in Australia, in a stage production of Ross, but worked as a director of theatre, notably Camelot. He said he accepted the role "because he was getting a bit rusty as far as acting was concerned. This will help keep me fresh and flexible." His wife Joan MacArthur had a role playing the wife of Westwell's character.

Reception
The TV critic for The Sydney Morning Herald thought that despite "a liberal sprinkling of cliches and a pattern of stilted patches in its dialogue" the play "maintained a high degree of tension... Two major merits distinguished it. One was the originality of its theme, and the other a consistently capable standard of acting."

References

External links

Australian drama television films
1964 television plays
1964 drama films